Khurshni is a rural locality (a selo) in Dakhadayevsky District, Republic of Dagestan, Russia. The population was 329 as of 2010. There are 8 streets.

Geography 
Khurshni is located 24 km west of Urkarakh (the district's administrative centre) by road. Mirzita and Kharbuk are the nearest rural localities.

Nationalities 
Dargins live there.

References 

Rural localities in Dakhadayevsky District